The 1907–08 City Cup was the fourteenth edition of the City Cup, a cup competition in Irish football.

The tournament was won by Linfield for the ninth time.

Group standings

References

1907–08 in Irish association football